Paulo Sérgio Rocha (born October 1, 1978 in Andradina) most commonly known as Paulo Sérgio, is a Brazilian defender. He currently plays for Murici.

Honours
Campeonato Brasileiro Série B: 2009

External links
 Paulo Sérgio at ZeroZero
 CBF
 Guardian Stats Centre
 Portuguesa squad

1978 births
Living people
Brazilian footballers
Association football defenders
Campeonato Brasileiro Série A players
Campeonato Brasileiro Série B players
Clube Náutico Marcílio Dias players
Comercial Futebol Clube (Ribeirão Preto) players
Avaí FC players
Figueirense FC players
Esporte Clube Noroeste players
Associação Desportiva São Caetano players
Sociedade Esportiva Palmeiras players
Grêmio Foot-Ball Porto Alegrense players
CR Vasco da Gama players
Associação Portuguesa de Desportos players
Ceará Sporting Club players
Clube de Regatas Brasil players
Mirassol Futebol Clube players
Murici Futebol Clube players
People from Andradina